Niu Weiyu (born 1927 in Tanghe, Henan) is a Chinese photojournalist whose career started in the 1940s with coverage of the Chinese Communist Party's wartime experiences and continued after 1949. She is praised for her photographs of ordinary workers and ethnic groups, and as one of the few women in photography, she specialized in female images.

She is a member of the Chinese Communist Party and the Chinese Photographers Association. Her husband, Gao Fan (1922-2004) was also a wartime and post-1949 photographer.

Career
In 1945, Niu entered Counter-Japanese Military and Political University, and in 1947 became an officer in the Political Department of the Liberated Area. She became a photographer attached to the Eighth Route Army, then turned to news photography for North China Pictorial and other journals.

After 1949, she became head of the Xinhua News Agency department of photography until her retirement in 1982. In 1975, as the Cultural Revolution was coming to an end, she went to Tibet, traveling by jeep from Chengdu.

References

Notes

External links 
 Light and Shadow Life "Old photos of the Tibetan-inhabited areas." Exhibition of Niu and Gan Fan's photos of Tibet.
 

1927 births
Chinese photographers
Chinese communists
War photographers
Artists from Henan
People from Nanyang, Henan
Living people